Slashers can refer to:

 Slashers (film)
 Slashers (slamball team)
 Night Slashers, an arcade game
 Longford Slashers, a Gaelic football team
 Negros Slashers, a former professional basketball team

See also 
 
 
 Slash (disambiguation)
 Slasher (disambiguation)